The Lioré et Olivier LeO 7 was a French bomber escort biplane designed and built by Lioré et Olivier for the French Air Force.

Design and development
The LeO 7 was three-seat bomber escort biplane developed from the LeO 5 ground-attack biplane. Appearing in 1922 the production version (the LeO 7/2) had a wide-track landing gear and gunner's cockpits in the snub nose and amidships. The pilot was located in a cockpit just behind the wing trailing edge.

Operational history
Twenty LeO 7/2s were built followed by 18 LeO 7/3s which were a navalised version with increased wingspan.

Variants
LeO 7
Prototype
LeO 7/2
Production version for the Armée de l'Air (French Air Force), 20 built
LeO 7/3
Production version for the Aéronautique Navale (French Naval Aviation), 18 built.

Operators

French Air Force
French Navy

Specifications (LeO 7/2)

References

Notes

Bibliography

 Taylor, John W. R. and Jean Alexander. Combat Aircraft of the World. New York: G.P. Putnam's Sons, 1969. .  
 Taylor, Michael J. H. Jane's Encyclopedia of Aviation. London: Studio Editions, 1989. . 

1920s French fighter aircraft
7
Biplanes
Twin piston-engined tractor aircraft
Aircraft first flown in 1922